Kind Lady is a  play by Edward Chodorov. The title may also refer to its two film adaptations:

Kind Lady (1935 film), starring Aline MacMahon
Kind Lady (1951 film), featuring Ethel Barrymore